François Dominique may refer to:

François Dominique de Barberie de Saint-Contest
François Dominique de Reynaud, Comte de Montlosier, French politician
François Dominique (writer), who worked with Louis Zukofsky

Persons with the given name
François Dominique Barreau de Chefdeville, French architect
François-Dominique Toussaint Louverture, leader of the Haitian Rebellion